Deborah "Deb" Schulte  (born 1960) is a former Canadian politician who represented the riding of King—Vaughan in the House of Commons of Canada from 2015 to 2021. A graduate of Princeton University, Schulte has a degree in mechanical and aerospace engineering. She is a former Minister of Seniors.

Background

From 2010-2014, she served as a Local and Regional Councillor for the City of Vaughan, Ontario, serving on both Vaughan City Council and York Regional Council. Prior to entering politics, Schulte worked for Bombardier Aerospace in management for twenty-two years. Prior to entering politics, she was a well-known community activist. She lives in Vaughan with her husband Dave and their two sons, Daniel and Derek.

Offices and Roles as a Parliamentarian
Parliamentary Secretary to the Minister of National Revenue.

Committees
Parliamentary Secretary — Non-Voting Member
Standing Committee on Finance

Parliamentary Associations and Interparliamentary Groups
Executive Member of the Canadian Branch of the Commonwealth Parliamentary Association and Canada-Italy Interparliamentary Group.
Member of the Canada-Europe Parliamentary Association, Canada-United Kingdom Inter-Parliamentary Association, Canada-United States Inter-Parliamentary Group, Canadian Branch of the Commonwealth Parliamentary Association, Canadian Delegation to the Organization for Security and Co-operation in Europe Parliamentary Assembly, Canadian Group of the Inter-Parliamentary Union, Canadian NATO Parliamentary Association and Canadian Section of ParlAmericas.

Private Members Motions
During the 42nd Parliament, 1st Session, Member of Parliament Deb Schulte drafted Bill M-64 (Italian Heritage Month) in 2016 and it was passed on May 17, 2017. The text of the motion states that, in the opinion of the House, the government should recognize the contributions that Italian-Canadians have made to Canadian society, the richness of the Italian language and culture, and the importance of educating and reflecting upon Italian heritage for future generations by declaring June, every year, Italian Heritage Month.

Electoral record

Federal

Municipal

References

External links
 Official Website
 Bio & mandate from the Prime Minister
 

Living people
Liberal Party of Canada MPs
Members of the House of Commons of Canada from Ontario
Members of the 29th Canadian Ministry
Members of the King's Privy Council for Canada
Women government ministers of Canada
Women members of the House of Commons of Canada
Women in Ontario politics
Ontario municipal councillors
People from Vaughan
1960 births
Members of the Cabinet of Canada
21st-century Canadian women politicians
Princeton University alumni